James Baines was a passenger clipper ship completely constructed of timber in the 1850s and launched on 25 July 1854 from the East Boston shipyard of the famous ship builder Donald McKay in the United States for the Black Ball Line of James Baines & Co., Liverpool. The clipper was one of the few known larger sailing ships rigged with a moonsail.

General description 

Ship builder Donald McKay laid all his skills and professional experience in the construction of this passenger carrying clipper ship, small faults that had been detected by him before in the sister ships were fixed during the building of James Baines. Regarding her lines, stem, and bow, she was not as sharp and hollow-lined as her sister ship Lightning or as "full" as her other sister ship Champion of the Seas. The ship's main frame was of white oak, the ceiling, planking, deck-frames and keelsons, of hard pine. The ship's hull was diagonally braced with iron, and square-fastened, and all the keelsons and waterways are scarphed and keyed. It was said in her time the style in which James Baines's hull was designed and built, both inside and outside, has not been surpassed or equalled, by any other ship Donald McKay has ever constructed. The stern and the bow including the cutwater were beautifully adorned with gilded carvings, the ship's hull was painted black with blue waterways and a blue underwater ship. Her mast-heads and yards were black and equipped with iron caps, the hoops on her masts were held in white as well as the deck houses and rails. On Mr James Baines order the ship was equipped and fitted with the best and most modern ship improvements (pumps, windlasses & winches, Crane's self-acting chain-stoppers (invented in 1852)).

As she was built for a passenger shipping line she provided luxury (1st class) accommodations equipped with the finest furniture available and mahogany panelling (wainscots), furthermore with standard rooms for the transportation of 700 passengers. The ship had also state-rooms and dining-rooms of the finest design. Three decks, a poop deck, two deck houses and a topgallant forecastle provided the accommodations for three classes of passengers and the 100 men crew whose bunks were built in the forecastle and in a deck house abaft the foremast. The ladies' cabin was in the stern section (aft) as well as the captain's rooms, the gentlemen's rooms were amidships to the ship's sides. All passenger and crew rooms were well ventilated and provided with sufficient light. James Baines was not only a beautiful but also a very fast ship holding still sailing ship records as that of her first voyage from Boston to Liverpool.

Namesake of James Baines was her owner James Baines of James Baines & Co. of Liverpool and Australian packets and was once described as "the most perfect ship afloat". Upon her first arrival in Liverpool a well-known Liverpool ship owner wrote to a Boston newspaper: "You want to know what professional men say about the ship James Baines? Her unrivalled passage, of course, brought her prominently before the public and she has already been visited by many of the most eminent mechanics of the country. She is so strongly built, so finely finished and is so beautiful a model that even envy cannot prompt a fault against her. On all hands she has been praised as the most perfect sailing ship that ever entered the river Mersey." (Cited from) - Her figurehead was, of course, a perfect likeness of James Baines, owner of the famous Black Ball Line of Liverpool in tailcoat and top hat, carved by Liverpudlian ship carver William Dodd of "Allan and Clotworthy's yard". Mr James Baines shipped the figurehead to the McKay shipyard, securely packed in a sturdy case.

History 

Capt. Charles McDonnell, late master of Marco Polo, took command of the ship. Her maiden voyage in 12 days and six hours from 12–24 September 1854 is still today an unbroken sailing ship record measured from East Boston (Boston Light) to Liverpool (Rock Light) - her homeport. During her short career her first voyage to Australia took her 65 days from Liverpool to Melbourne (her 'second' maiden voyage from her homeport) in 1854 and 69½ days for the return passage including the famous  day's run. She made four 'round' voyages to Melbourne and back to Liverpool via the Indian Ocean. In July 1857, James Baines (together with Champion of the Seas) was reviewed by Queen Victoria and the Prince Consort Albert while lying in Portsmouth. According to Lubbock, the Queen made remarks to the effect that "she did not know she possessed such a splendid ship in her Mercantile Marine." The clipper was in Portsmouth to load troops bound for India, having been chartered by the British Government to transport 1,000 men of the 97th Regiment. She returned to England with a cargo of jute, linseed, raw cowhides and rice.

Fire and loss of the ship

James Baines caught fire on Thursday morning, 22 April 1858 while discharging her cargo in the Huskisson Dock at Liverpool following her only voyage from India. The ship burned down to the waterline. Her remains, including the most of the undischarged cargo, were abandoned as a total loss amounting to £170,000 to her owner James Baines because the ship's insurance policy had expired three days before. The damaged hull was sold to the Liverpudlian shipowner Robert Pace for £1,080, who converted it into a coal barge which is said to have collided with another barge in 1860 at Galway harbour, Ireland. Still mentioned in the Liverpool Ship's Register of 1863 her final fate is unknown. Another reference has it that the ship became a landing stage in Liverpool harbour for the debarking steamer passengers. Capt. Chas. McDonnell, the first and last master of James Baines was broken-hearted following the disastrous end of his fine ship. He retired from naval service and died of pneumonia a few months later in his mother's cottage at Glenariff, County Antrim, Northern Ireland.

Rigging 

James Baines was a very heavily sparred ship being 2,275 GRT (Gross Registered Tons), she was wide, carrying 1,400 tons of cargo in her holds, and accommodating 800 passengers and crew in her 5 decks (3 continuous decks, forecastle and poop decks). Her masts called fore, main, and mizzen masts carried all in all a maximum of 43 sails as a full-rigged ship with studding sails. In detail:

 16 square sails (5-5-5, later 5-6-5)
   6 staysails
   4 jibs
   1 fore and aft sail - the spanker and
 16 studding sails

All three masts (with lower, top, and topgallant masts including royal and skysail masts) had a course sail, a topsail, a topgallant sail, a royal sail, and a skysail. The main-skysail mast has been lengthened and fitted with a moonsail later on. Her sail suit was made by Messrs. Porter, Mayhew & Co., Boston. Older pictures show the ship with only four square sails on the fore and mizzen masts, and five on the main mast.

References

Bibliography 

 Mary Ellen Chase: Donald McKay and the Clipper Ships. Houghton Mifflin Company, Boston, 1959.
 Octavius T. Howe & Fredric C. Matthews : American Clipper Ships 1833-1858. Argosy Antiquarian, New York, 1967
 Helen & Jacques La Grange: Clipper Ships of America and Great Britain: 1833-1869. G. P. Putnam's & Sons, New York, 1936.
 Richard C. McKay: Some Famous Sailing Ships and Their Builder, Donald McKay. G. P. Putnam's Sons, New York, 1928; Easton Press, Norwalk (CT.), 1988.
 Richard C. McKay: Donald McKay and His Famous Sailing Ships. Dover Publications Inc., 1995 (reprint of the 1928 edition); 
 Duncan McLean: The New Clipper James Baines. The Boston Daily Atlas, Vol. XXIII, No. 53, Friday, 1 September 1854. Reprinted in NRJ Vol. 25, pp 33–35.
 Michael K. Stammers: The Passage Makers. Teredo Books, Brighton, 1978;

External links 
 
The Era of the Clipper Ships - James Baines
The Era of the Clipper Ships - James Baines cont.
Detailed description on www.bruzelius.info
Saling Ships: James Baines
Short ship history taken from Houghton Mifflin's "Ships of the World: An Historical Encyclopedia"
The "Blackball line" with house flag on www.fotw.us
The first "Blackball Line" of New York with house flag
House flag of "Jaimes Baines & Co. (Blackball Line)" with smaller "black ball" than that of the American Blackball line house flag

Individual sailing vessels
Ships built in Boston
Ships designed by Donald McKay
Age of Sail merchant ships of the United States
Victorian-era passenger ships of the United Kingdom
Troop ships of the United Kingdom
Maritime incidents in April 1858
Barges
1854 ships
Full-rigged ships
Ship fires